The 1991-92 Division 1 season was the 28th of the competition of the first-tier football in Senegal.  The tournament was organized by the Senegalese Football Federation.  The season began in October 1991 and finished on 9 August 1992.  ASEC Ndiambour won the first title and participated in the 1993 African Cup of Champions Clubs the following year.  US Gorée participated in the 1993 CAF Cup, ASC Jeanne d'Arc in the 1993 CAF Winners' Cup and ASC Diaraf in the 1993 West African Cup.

SEIB Diourbel was the defending team of the title.  A total of 16 clubs participated in the competition.  The season featured 450 matches and scored 301 goals.  No new clubs came from the second division (Division 2).

Participating clubs

 US Gorée
 Damels Tivaouane
 ASC Port Autonome
 Dialdiop SC
 AS Douanes
 ASC Jeanne d'Arc
 Casa Sports
 US Ouakam

 SOTRAC Dakar
 ASC Diaraf
 Stade de Mbour
 US Rail
 ASC Linguère
 ETICS Mboro
 ASC Mbosse Kaolack
 ASEC Ndiambour

Overview
The league was contested by 14 teams with ASEC Ndiambour winning the championship.

League standings

Footnotes

External links
1991–92 Senegalese Division 1 season at RSSSF

Football in Senegal
Senegal
Senegal Premier League seasons